Nicrophorus tenuipes is a burying beetle described by Lewis in 1887.

References

Silphidae
Beetles of North America
Beetles described in 1887